Chemical  contamination may refer to:

 The chemical hazards produced by the presence of a chemical
 The use of an adulterant
 The use of a chemical weapon